Football Manager 2008 (also known as Worldwide Soccer Manager 2008 in North America, and Fútbol Manager 2008 in South America) is the principal title of the 2008 edition of the football management simulation game series Football Manager. FM08 is the fourth game in the Football Manager series. It was developed by Sports Interactive, and published by Sega. There are over 5,000 playable teams from more than 50 countries. The demo for Football Manager 2008 was released on 30 September 2007.

The game was originally intended to be released on 19 October 2007, but due to early shipments by many retailers carrying their game, Sports Interactive moved the release date to 18 October 2007.

Football Manager 2008 was the last Football Manager game to be released on the Xbox 360 and the last to be released on an Xbox console for thirteen years, until Football Manager 2021 was released on the Xbox One, Xbox Series X, and Xbox Series S on 1 December 2020. FM08 was succeeded by Football Manager 2009.

Gameplay
FM08 features similar gameplay to that of the Football Manager series. Gameplay consists of taking charge of a professional association football team, as the team manager. Players can sign football players to contracts, manage finances for the club, and give team talks to players. FM08 is a simulation of real world management, with the player being judged on various factors by the club's AI owners and board.

FM08 includes new features, including an advisor system, similar to how assistant managers work, and a new finance system.

Licenses
Miles Jacobson, of Sports Interactive, said:

"We are very proud to announce the procurement of a licence for the French Ligue de Football Professionnel, with both the 1st & 2nd divisions covered by the licence that provides real club names, logo’s and kits for all the clubs in those leagues.

We also welcome back the Dutch national team to the game, which was missing from last years  game.

On top of this, we have new licences in Italy from Sampdoria and Fiorentina."

Reception

Football Manager 2008 computer version received a "Platinum" sales award from the Entertainment and Leisure Software Publishers Association (ELSPA), indicating sales of at least 300,000 copies in the United Kingdom.

See also
Championship Manager 2008

References

External links
 Official Football Manager 2008 Site - Official game website from Sega and Sports Interactive

2007 video games
2008
Games for Windows certified games
MacOS games
PlayStation Portable games
Video games developed in the United Kingdom
Windows games
Xbox 360 games